The R469 road is a regional road in Ireland linking Kilmurry to Ennis. The road is entirely in County Clare.

See also
Roads in Ireland
National primary road
National secondary road

References
Roads Act 1993 (Classification of Regional Roads) Order 2006 – Department of Transport

Regional roads in the Republic of Ireland
Roads in County Clare